Marin Con (born 8 February 1985) is a Croatian football defender. He currently plays for NK Krk in the Croatian Third Football League.

References
وصول الكرواتي مارين كون تمهيدا للانضمام لصحار, azamn.com, 6 January 2016

External links
Marin Con at Fotballzz

1985 births
Living people
Footballers from Rijeka
Association football central defenders
Croatian footballers
HNK Rijeka players
NK Novalja players
HNK Orijent players
NK Pomorac 1921 players
Flamurtari Vlorë players
NK Zadar players
Al-Fahaheel FC players
NK Krk players
Sohar SC players
Croatian Football League players
Kategoria Superiore players
Kuwait Premier League players
Oman Professional League players
Croatian expatriate footballers
Expatriate footballers in Albania
Croatian expatriate sportspeople in Albania
Expatriate footballers in Kuwait
Croatian expatriate sportspeople in Kuwait
Expatriate footballers in Oman
Croatian expatriate sportspeople in Oman